In facial anatomy, the modiolus is a chiasma of facial muscles held together by fibrous tissue, located lateral and slightly superior to each angle of the mouth.  It is important in moving the mouth, facial expression and in dentistry. It is extremely important in relation to stability of lower denture, because of the strength and variability of movement  of the area. It derives its motor nerve supply from the facial nerve, and its blood supply from labial branches of the facial artery.

It is contributed to by the following muscles:  orbicularis oris, buccinator, levator anguli oris, depressor anguli oris, zygomaticus major, risorius, quadratus labii superioris, quadratus labii inferioris.

References

2.Al-Hoqail RA, Abdel Meguid EM. An anatomical and analytical study of the modiolus: enlightening its relevance to plastic surgery. Aesthetic Plast Surg. 2009;33(2):147–152. doi:10.1007/s00266-008-9187-x

3.Pélissier P, Pistre V, Bustamante K, Martin D, Baudet J. Le modiolus. Anatomie comparée, rappels embryologique et physiologique, intérêt chirurgical [The modiolus. Comparative anatomy, embryological and physiological review, surgical importance]. Ann Chir Plast Esthet. 2000;45(1):41–47.

4.Yu SK, Lee MH, Kim HS, Park JT, Kim HJ, Kim HJ. Histomorphologic approach for the modiolus with reference to reconstructive and aesthetic surgery. J Craniofac Surg. 2013;24(4):1414–1417. doi:10.1097/SCS.0b013e318292c939

Muscular system

fr:Modiolus (genre)